Anthene lucretilis, the irrorated ciliate blue, is a butterfly in the family Lycaenidae. It is found in Sierra Leone, Ivory Coast, Ghana, Togo, Nigeria, Cameroon, Gabon, the Republic of the Congo, Angola, the Democratic Republic of the Congo and Uganda.

The larval host plant is unknown, but the larvae are known to be associated with the ant species Crematogaster buchneri race winkleri, Crematogaster buchneri race alligatrix and Pheidole rotundata. The dark green larvae feed in pits they make in the soft cortex of stems of the food plant and shelter inside the hollowed out stems containing nests of the host-ant.  They reach the inside of the stems through entrance holes in the cortex of the stem. Pupation takes place within the hollowed out stem.

Subspecies
Anthene lucretilis lucretilis (Sierra Leone, Ivory Coast, Ghana, Togo, Nigeria: south and the Cross River loop, Cameroon, Gabon, Congo, Angola)
Anthene lucretilis albipicta (Talbot, 1935) (Democratic Republic of the Congo: east to Equateur and Uele, western Uganda)

References

Butterflies described in 1874
Anthene
Butterflies of Africa
Taxa named by William Chapman Hewitson